Kojo Matić (born 7 November 1995) is a professional footballer who plays as a midfielder.

Career

Early tenure in Slovakia
Matić arrived in Slovakia in the winter of 2017. He spent his first two years in three clubs in 3. Liga West - Nové Zámky, Družstevník Veľké Ludince, Gabčíkovo. Across two calendar years, he scored over 20 goals in almost 100 games in the league.

FK Pohronie
Matić joined Pohronie in January 2020. It was his first top-division football club. He transferred into the club from the third division club of Gabčíkovo. Upon his transfer he became a third player named Matić to feature in the league, following brothers Nemanja and Uroš. They are not related. Upon his arrival, Matić had commented on the professionalism in the club and the satisfying winter preparation. Matić was congratulated on this transfer by the Real Madrid star Luka Jović, via Instagram, who was his neighbour and with whom he remains a close friend.

Matić was first nominated for a Fortuna Liga fixture in a goal-less tie against Nitra at pod Zoborom on 15 February 2020. He did not appear in the match though. He scored two goals in two friendly matches against Ružomberok in late May 2020, as Fortuna Liga sides had prepared for a league restart. First, on 25 May, at pod Čebraťom, he equalised the game to the final score of 1–1, following earlier goal from Rastislav Kružliak. Few days later he scored the opening goal of the match in a 3–1 win over the same opponent on home stadium. Pohronie scored two more through James Weir and Patrik Abrahám.

He departed from the club in January 2021, with a single Slovnaft Cup goal against Dunajská Lužná.

External links
Futbalnet profile
Fieldoo profile

References

1995 births
Living people
People from Bijeljina
Bosnia and Herzegovina footballers
Bosnia and Herzegovina expatriate footballers
Serbs of Bosnia and Herzegovina
Association football midfielders
SC Dornach players
FK Podrinje Janja players
FKM Nové Zámky players
TJ Družstevník Veľké Ludince players
ŠK 1923 Gabčíkovo players
FK Pohronie players
Partizán Bardejov players
FK Zvijezda 09 players
Slovak Super Liga players
3. Liga (Slovakia) players
First League of the Republika Srpska players
Bosnia and Herzegovina expatriate sportspeople in Switzerland
Bosnia and Herzegovina expatriate sportspeople in Slovakia
Expatriate footballers in Switzerland
Expatriate footballers in Slovakia